Caught in the Act may refer to:

Film and television
Caught in the Act (1931 film), a comedy film directed by Hanns Schwarz and Georges Tréville 
Caught in the Act (1997 film), a comedy film starring Sara Crowe, Annette Badland, Nadia Sawalha and Paul Shelley
Caught in the Act (2008 film), a comedy film written by and starring Steve Speirs as the lead character
Caught in the Act (Frasier), a 2004 episode of Frasier
Caught in the Act (The Goodies), a 1970 episode of The Goodies
Caught in the Act (Modern Family), a 2011 episode of Modern Family
Caught in the Act (The Outer Limits), a 1995 episode of The Outer Limits
COPS:Caught in the Act, a 2004 DVD release of the American documentary television show COPS
Caught In The Act, a sketch comedy series produced by David Dillehunt from 1999 to 2004
Caught in the Act, a 1993 television movie

Music 
Caught in the Act (group), a half English, half Dutch boy group

Albums
Caught in the Act (Michael Bublé album), 2005
Caught in the Act (Debra Byrne album), 1991
Caught in the Act by Cinderella, reissue title of Live at the Key Club, 1999
Caught in the Act (Commodores album), 1975
Caught in the Act, Eric Gable album, 1989
Caught in the Act, Steve Gibbons Band album, 1977
Caught in the Act (Grand Funk Railroad album), 1975
Caught in the Act (Pamyua album), 2003 album by Pamyua
Caught in the Act (Redgum album), 1983
Caught in the Act (Styx album), 1984

Songs
"Caught in the Act", song by Chaka Khan from I Feel for You (1985)
"Caught in the Act", song by Redgum from Caught in the Act (Redgum album) (1983)

Other 
In flagrante delicto, Latin legal term for being caught in the commission of an offense
Garfield: Caught in the Act, a 1995 game for the Sega Genesis
Caught in the Act (ballet), 2000 ballet by Tim Rushton
Caught in the Act or Kilroy Was Here, a rock opera film by Styx